La bohème is an 1896 opera by Giacomo Puccini.

La bohème may also refer to:

Stage works 
 La bohème (Leoncavallo), 1897 opera by Ruggero Leoncavallo
 La bohème (musical), Broadway musical adaptation originally staged in 1927

Film 
 La Bohème (1916 film), film adaptation by Albert Capellari
 La Bohème (1926 film), film adaptation by King Vidor
 La Vie de Bohème (1945 film), film adaptation by Marcel L'Herbier
 La Bohème (1965 film), film adaptation by Franco Zeffirelli
 La Bohème (1988 film), film adaptation by Luigi Comencini
 La Bohème (2008 film), film adaptation by Robert Dornhelm, with Anna Netrebko and Rolando Villazón
 La bohème (2009 film), short film by Werner Herzog set to "O Soave Fanciulla"

Music 
 La bohème (album), 1966 album by Charles Aznavour
 "La Bohème" (Charles Aznavour song), 1965 song by Charles Aznavour
 Boheme (album), 1995 album by Deep Forest

See also 
 Labo M, pun on La bohème, 2003 album by French rock performer Matthieu Chedid, also known as -M-
 Bohemian (disambiguation)
 La Vie de Bohème (disambiguation)
 La Boheme Magazine